Gnadau is a village and a former municipality in the district Salzlandkreis, in Saxony-Anhalt, Germany. Since 1 September 2010, it is part of the town Barby. It was founded as a settlement of the Moravian Church (Herrnhuter Brüdergemeine) in the 1767 and is seat of a number of diaconal institutions. The name means "Meadow of Grace".

References

Former municipalities in Saxony-Anhalt
Barby, Germany